David Hay (born 29 January 1948) is a Scottish former football player and manager. He broke into the Celtic team in the late 1960s, as one of a generation of players who continued a highly successful era for the club. A contract dispute between Hay and Celtic led to him being transferred to Chelsea in 1974. He played in over 100 league games for Chelsea, but was forced to retire in 1979 due to a detached retina. Hay appeared in 27 international matches for Scotland, and was selected for their 1974 FIFA World Cup squad.

After retiring as a player, Hay entered football management with Motherwell in 1981. He led them to a promotion in 1981–82, but left the club at the end of the season. He was then appointed Celtic manager in 1983, and enjoyed some success as they won the 1984–85 Scottish Cup and the Scottish league championship in 1985–86. In the 1990s he returned to Celtic as Chief Scout and later Assistant General manager.

Hay also won the Norwegian league championship during a brief stint with Lillestrøm SK. He subsequently worked for St Mirren, Livingston and Dunfermline Athletic.

Playing career
After completing his secondary education at St Mirin's Academy in Paisley, Hay signed for Celtic in 1966. He became one of the "Quality Street Gang" reserve team which eventually took the places of the ageing Lisbon Lions. He made his league debut on 6 March 1968 against Aberdeen going on to make 230 appearances for Celtic scoring 12 goals, winning 5 League Championships, 3 Scottish Cups and 1 League Cup. After playing for Scotland in the 1974 World Cup in West Germany, and following a dispute with Celtic, he was transferred to Chelsea for a club record £225,000. Initially signed as a direct replacement for Alan Hudson in midfield, he adopted a more defensive role in the young Chelsea side that emerged following their relegation a year later. In 1979 a serious knee injury forced him to retire from the game as a player. He had also suffered problems with a detached retina and eventually lost full vision in his right eye. He won a total 27 caps for Scotland.

Management career

Motherwell
His first venture into football management was when he took over the reins at Motherwell in 1981 following Ally MacLeod. He led Well to the Scottish First Division title and promotion to the Scottish Premier Division. He left at the end of the 1981-82 season.

Celtic
Hay succeeded Billy McNeill as Celtic manager in 1983, winning the Scottish Cup in 1985 and the Premier Division in dramatic fashion in 1986. Celtic won their final game 5–0 against St Mirren at Love Street but needed Hearts, who were league leaders and favourites to lift the trophy, to lose to Dundee at Dens Park. Albert Kidd secured the victory for Dundee with two goals and Celtic were crowned champions. After Celtic failed to win a trophy in 1986–87, Hay left Celtic. He was asked to resign, but refused, so he was sacked and was replaced by McNeill.

Lillestrom SK
In 1989, Hay ventured to Norway and led Lillestrom SK to the Norwegian Premier League championship.

St Mirren
In 1991, Hay took on Paisley club St Mirren but left a year later.

Return to Celtic
Hay became chief scout at Celtic in 1994, and was responsible for identifying players such as Jorge Cadete, Paolo di Canio and Pierre van Hooijdonk who signed for the club. He became Assistant General manager to Jock Brown in 1997, but left in 1998 in acrimonious circumstances.

Livingston
Hay teamed up with Jim Leishman in 2000 as co-managers of Livingston, and led the club to the Scottish First Division title at the end of 2000-01, and the club's first promotion to the Scottish Premier League. Their debut season in the top flight in 2001-02 earned them their first qualification into Europe with a UEFA Cup place. The 2002-03 season was less impressive and they both stepped down from the management position, although they both stayed at the club. Brazilian Marcio Maximo Barcellos took over.

Hay returned to the manager's job shortly into 2003-04 season, this time in sole charge, taking over from Marcio Maximo after just 9 games of the season. Hay went on to win the Scottish League Cup while the club was in administration, beating heavy favourites Hibernian (who beat Celtic and Rangers en route to the final). Despite this success, the veteran boss was released at the end of the season to be replaced by Allan Preston, one of his first team coaches, by new chairman, Pearse Flynn of the Lionheart Consortium.

Dunfermline Athletic
Hay was then appointed manager of Dunfermline Athletic, succeeding Jimmy Calderwood. He rejoined with Jim Leishman who was the Fife club's Director of Football. He was sacked near the end of the season with the club struggling in the Scottish Premier League.

After management

Hay rejoined Livingston on 16 June 2008 in an advisory role. He briefly became interim manager in 2009 after Paul Hegarty was suspended by the club.

In 2015 Hay returned to Celtic as a director of the Celtic Pools, which raises money for the youth academy. He has also worked in a business development role for New College Lanarkshire.

Honours

Player 
Celtic
Scottish League Champions: 1969–70, 1970–71, 1971–72, 1972–73, 1973–74
Scottish Cup:  1970–71, 1973–74
Scottish League Cup: 1969–70
Glasgow Cup: 1969–70
European Cup: runner-up 1969–70

Chelsea
Football League Division Two: Promotion 1976–77

Scotland
British Home Championship: Shared 1969–70, 1973–74

Manager
Motherwell
Scottish First Division: 1981–82

Celtic
Scottish League Champions: 1985–86
Scottish Cup: 1984–85

Lillestrøm
Norwegian League Champions: 1989

Livingston
Scottish First Division: 2000–01
Scottish League Cup: 2003–04

Career statistics

International

Managerial statistics 

 First spell at Livingston was a co-manager role with Jim Leishman.

See also
List of Scotland national football team captains

References

External links

1948 births
Living people
Footballers from Paisley, Renfrewshire
Scottish footballers
Scotland international footballers
Celtic F.C. players
Chelsea F.C. players
Scottish Football League players
English Football League players
1974 FIFA World Cup players
Scottish football managers
Motherwell F.C. managers
Celtic F.C. managers
Lillestrøm SK managers
St Mirren F.C. managers
Livingston F.C. managers
Dunfermline Athletic F.C. managers
Livingston F.C. non-playing staff
Watford F.C. non-playing staff
Scottish Premier League managers
Scottish Football League managers
People educated at St Mirin's Academy
Scottish Football League representative players
Scottish expatriate football managers
Scottish expatriate sportspeople in Norway
Expatriate football managers in Norway
Scotland under-23 international footballers
Association football midfielders
Swindon Town F.C. non-playing staff